Richard Kwame Peprah is a former Ghanaian politician. Peprah served in the Government of Ghana from 1983 - 2001 in the Rawlings government.
He was educated at Achimota School

Ministerial positions held
He served in the capacity of Minister of Mines and Energy from 1993 to 1995 and as a Minister of Finance from 1995 to 2001. He is an independent director of Skipper Ghana.

References

External links
 Bio African People Database

Year of birth missing (living people)
Living people
Ghanaian economists
Finance ministers of Ghana
Energy ministers of Ghana